Mats Haldin (born 17 May 1975) is a Finnish orienteering competitor and two-time European champion with the Finnish relay team. He received a silver medal with the Finnish relay team at the 2003 World Orienteering Championships in Rapperswil/Jona, and again in 2006 in Aarhus. He received a bronze medal in relay at the 2007 World Championships in Kyiv. At the 2009 World Orienteering Championships in Miskolc he won a bronze medal in the relay, together with Topi Anjala and Tero Föhr. 

His wife is Czech orienteer Vendula Klechová. Daughter Hanna was born on 25 May 2011.

Awards
Finnish Orienteer of the Year 2002.

See also
 Finnish orienteers
 List of orienteers
 List of orienteering events

References

External links
 
 

1975 births
Living people
Finnish orienteers
Male orienteers
Foot orienteers
World Orienteering Championships medalists
Swedish-speaking Finns
Competitors at the 2001 World Games